Aniket Sunil Tatkare is an Indian politician belonging to the Nationalist Congress Party. On 24 May 2018, he was elected to the Maharashtra Legislative Council by receiving 421 votes, beating his rival Rajeev Sabale from Shiv Sena, who received 221 votes.

References

Nationalist Congress Party politicians from Maharashtra
Year of birth missing (living people)
Living people
Members of the Maharashtra Legislative Council